James Savage may refer to:

 Jim Savage (1817–1852), California pioneer
 Jim Savage (athlete) (born 1936), Paralympic athlete from New Zealand
 James Savage (antiquary) (1767–1845), English writer
 James Savage (banker) (1784–1873), wrote dictionary on first settlers of New England
 James Savage (footballer) (1876–?), English professional footballer
 James Savage (architect) (1779–1852), British architect
 James D. Savage (born 1951), political science professor at the University of Virginia
 Leonard Jimmie Savage (1917–1971), known as Jimmie, American mathematician and statistician
 Jimmie Savage (baseball) (James Harold Savage, 1883–1940), Major League Baseball outfielder
 Jimmy Savage (James R. Savage, 1910–1951), Chicago show businessman and Chicago Tribune columnist
 James Savage (born 1969), American rapper also known as Jayo Felony

See also
 Savage (surname)